Raida may refer to

 Raido, a Proto-Germanic name
Al-Raida (The Woman Pioneer), a Lebanese feminist journal 
Roc Raida (1972–2009), American DJ, turntablist and producer
Redundant Array of Independent Detection Agents, a post-blockchain authentication protocol